The 2002 UCLA Bruins football team represented the University of California, Los Angeles in the 2002 NCAA Division I-A football season.  They played their home games at the Rose Bowl in Pasadena, California and were led by head coach Bob Toledo, who was fired at the end of the regular season.

Schedule

Roster

Team players in the NFL

References

UCLA
UCLA Bruins football seasons
Las Vegas Bowl champion seasons
UCLA Bruins football